İSPARK İstanbul Otopark İşletmeleri Tic. AŞ (Istanbul Parking Lot Operations Trade S.A) or simply İSPARK, is a company that operates parking lots in Istanbul. Managed by the Istanbul Metropolitan Municipality, the company provides service in 606 parking lots and also is a member of the European Parking Association.

In 2012, İspark carried out the bicycle parking project İsbike to increase environmental consciousness in Istanbul. In 2014, the company built boat parks which in İstinye and Tarabya Bays, a year later the company announced that they were planning to build boat parks in Bebek, Beykoz, Kuruçeşme and Paşabahçe, but these plans were abandoned. The company also owns the Alibeyköy Bus Terminal in Istanbul.

Projects

iTaksi 

iTaksi is a ridesharing app (e-taxi app) that was founded in 2016 by the Istanbul Metropolitan Municipality. The app has its own display for taxi drivers to see the map, this display also works as a POS screen for contactless credit cards and Istanbulkarts.

İsbike

References 

Parking companies
Companies based in Istanbul
Transport in Istanbul
Transport companies of Turkey